The Minister of International Trade Diversification was a minister of the Crown position in the Canadian Cabinet who was responsible for the federal government's international trade portfolio.

Along with the Minister of Foreign Affairs and the Minister of International Development and La Francophonie, the office was one of the three ministers who led Global Affairs Canada, the Canadian foreign affairs department. Since the 2019 federal election, the international trade portfolio is now overseen by the Minister of Small Business, Export Promotion and International Trade, who remains one of the three ministers of the Crown responsible for Global Affairs Canada.

History 
The post was first established in 1983 as the Minister for International Trade. This title changed to Minister of International Trade in 2015.

On 18 July 2018, Prime Minister Justin Trudeau changed the title to Minister of International Trade Diversification, appointing Jim Carr as the new minister. Following the 2019 federal election, the duties of the position have been absorbed by the Minister of Small Business, Export Promotion and International Trade.

Ministers
Key:

References

Canada
International Trade (Canada)